Mékambo is a small town in north-eastern Gabon on the banks of the Zadié river. It is located in the Ogooué-Ivindo province of Gabon and is the seat of the Zadié Department. It has received international press for recent outbreaks of Ebola hemorrhagic fever in 1994 and 1997.

It is served by Mékambo Airport.

Climate 
Mékambo has a tropical dry savanna climate (Köppen climate classification As).

Minerals 
Iron ore deposits are found in the vicinity.

References 

Populated places in Ogooué-Ivindo Province